Mark Vincent Collins (born 14 August 1965 in Barton-upon-Irwell, Lancashire) is an English musician, best known as a guitarist of the British alternative rock band The Charlatans.

Career
Collins attended school with future Oasis guitarist Paul "Bonehead" Arthurs. He began his music career in 1986 as guitarist with The Waltones, indie pop band based in Manchester. After the recording of their second album in 1990, drummer Alex Fyans left the group and the band relaunched themselves as Candlestick Park. The band split up a year later. Collins joined The Charlatans in 1991 after Jon Baker's departure.

"I just went down there thinking the Charlatans wanted a second guitarist. I turned up with my guitar at a rehearsal room in Birmingham; there was no other guitarist there and they just said "Do you fancy joining the band?" I said "Oh. Go on then, why not?" It all happened really quickly." ~ Mark Collins

Collins made his debut on a non-album single, "Me. In Time", and while the band was not satisfied with the release itself, he has remained with them ever since.

In 2003, he produced the track "Same Sad Story" from Adam Masterson's debut album, which was released as a single later in November that year. Same year, Collins joined Starsailor, playing additional and lead guitar on their nationwide UK tour and the Isle of Wight Festival later in 2005.

Friend and fan of The Rolling Stones' Ronnie Wood, Collins shared guitar with him on several events such as the Hero2Hero gigs, Shepherd's Bush Empire and Fleadh Festival in 2004.

Personal life
Mark Collins has three children: Ella (born 1998), Stanley (born 1999) and Lois (born 2003).

References

External links
The Charlatans Official Website – THE CHARLATANS

1965 births
Living people
Musicians from Manchester
English rock guitarists
English male guitarists
English songwriters
The Charlatans (English band) members
Britpop musicians